Graham Crouch (11 January 1948, Ballarat – 28 November 2019, Lengenfeld, Germany) was an Australian former middle-distance runner who competed in the 1976 Summer Olympics.

Major Competitions

Crouch won the 1500m at the 1968/69 and 1977/78 Australian Athletics Championship. He also won 5000 m at 1975/76 Championships.

Crouch's fifth place run in the classic 1974 Commonwealth Games 1500m established a new Australian record, breaking that set by Herb Elliot at the 1960 Olympic Games.

He was a member of the Box Hill Athletics Club.

He was married and lived in Lengenfeld (Germany). In the last week of November 2019 he lost his fight with cancer.

References

External links
 Athletics Australia Results

1948 births
2019 deaths
Australian male long-distance runners
Olympic athletes of Australia
Athletes (track and field) at the 1974 British Commonwealth Games
Athletes (track and field) at the 1976 Summer Olympics
Commonwealth Games competitors for Australia
20th-century Australian people
21st-century Australian people